Alexia is the fifth studio album by Italian singer Alexia released in 2002. The album was the first release in Italian. It gave boost to her career. The album was released in Italy on CD and cassette on 8 March 2002. It was certified gold by the Federation of the Italian Music Industry for domestic sales exceeding 50,000 units.

The album contains one English recording, an English version of "Dimmi come…" entitled "Don't You Know" though this would be re-recorded in English again for an international release. Two of the tracks, "Se un giorno" and "L'amore vince" are Italian renditions of the songs "Whenever You Want Me" and "The Real Thing" from her previous album Mad for Music. "Non lasciarmi mai" was released as a single on 24 June 2002 with "Hasta la vista baby" being released as a radio promo third single after the International release of the album.

Track listing 

All songs composed and written by Alessia Aquilani & Massimo Marcolini

 "Dimmi come…" – 3:31
 "Dire dare" – 3:09
 "A casa di Jerry" – 3:24
 "Senza di te" – 4:36
 "Non lasciarmi mai" – 3:30
 "Se un giorno" – 4:11
 "Hasta la vista baby" – 3:47
 "L'amore vince" – 3:33
 "Blues" – 4:23
 "Don't You Know (Dimmi come)" – 3:33

On 24 August 2002, Alexia released a re-recorded version of the album for the international market and it would be her last English studio album. Seven of the tracks were re-recorded in English (including "Don't You Know" being re-recorded), with four lifted from her previous English album Mad for Music (though unlike "Mad for Music", "It's Not the End" and "Whenever You Want Me" were not mixed into each other). The English versions are not all direct translations of the Italian versions, in particular "Non lasciarmi mai". Three tracks from the Italian release are added as bonus tracks, though "Dimmi come..." was not listed on the sleeve. Don't You Know was the only single release from this version of the album.

International Edition

Track listing 
 "Don't You Know" (previously 'Dimmi Come') – 3:31
 "Flower Power" (previously 'Dire Dare') – 3:08
 "Jerry" (previously 'A casa di Jerry') – 3:24
 "This Is My Life" (previously 'Senza di te') – 4:37
 "Don't Leave Me This Way" (previously 'Non lasciarmi mai') – 3:35
 "Whenever You Want Me" (previously 'Se un giorno') – 4:11
 "Hasta la vista baby" – 3:45
 "The Real Thing" (previously 'L'amore vince')  – 3:33
 "Blues" – 4:22
 "It's Not the End" – 4:36
 "Sometimes" – 3:45
 "Senza di te" – 4:33
 "Se un giorno" – 4:13
 "Dimmi come…" – 3:33

Personnel
 Alexia – arranger, programming, background vocals, producer, drum programming
 Enrico La Falce – mixing
 Wendy Lewis – background vocals
 Roberta Magnetti – background vocals
 Massimo Marcolini – arranger
 Lele Melotti – drums
 Alfredo Petroli – executive producer
 Al Portento – percussion
 Loris Rocchi – make-up, hair stylist
 Simona Silvestri – coordination
 Giuseppe Spada – artwork

Chart performance

Certifications

References

External links

2002 albums
Alexia (Italian singer) albums